General elections were held in South Africa on 24 April 1974. They were called one year earlier than scheduled by Prime Minister John Vorster on 4 February. The House of Assembly was increased from 166 to 171 members. The election was once again won by the National Party, with a slightly increased parliamentary majority.

The Progressive Party made a major advance, however. In addition to Helen Suzman, re-elected for Houghton, five other members won seats including the party leader Colin Eglin. A seventh member of the caucus was elected at a by-election soon after. The United Party won 41 seats. The election also saw Harry Schwarz, leader of the United Party in the Transvaal, enter Parliament. Schwartz would soon lead a break away from the United Party and would become one of the Apartheid's more prominent opponents in Parliament, first forming the Reform Party and then joining with the Progressive Party to form the Progressive Reform Party in 1975, under the leadership of Colin Eglin.

Nominations
Nominations closed on 18 March. A total of 334 candidates were nominated for 171 seats: National Party 137, United Party 110, Herstigte Nasionale Party 46, Progressive Party 23, Democratic Party 7 and others 11. 46 seats were won unopposed, 32 for the National Party and 14 for the United Party.

Results

House of Assembly
125 of the 171 seats were contested. Voting did not take place in two constituencies, Pinelands and Wonderboom, where by-elections were later held; Pinelands was won by the Progressive Party and  Wonderboom by the National Party.

By province

Senate
The elections for the Senate were held on 30 May by an electoral college made up of members of the Assembly and various others. The National Party gained one seat at the expense of the United Party, winning 32 of the 44 seats (the United Party held 12 seats).

References

General elections in South Africa
South Africa
General
Events associated with apartheid
April 1974 events in Africa
Election and referendum articles with incomplete results